A trailer sailer is a type of sailboat that has been designed to be easily transported using a boat trailer towed by an automobile. They are generally larger than a sailing dinghy. Trailer sailers include day sailers and small cabin cruisers, suitable for living on.

Trailer sailers are used for both racing and recreation and are popular with small families and retirees. They occupy a space between smaller trailerable sailing dinghies which are intended for day use and larger boats which can only be removed from the water with specialised equipment such as boat lifting cranes.

Unlike dinghies, many feature enclosed cabins which allow for overnight sleeping and dry storage. Most trailer sailers also feature ballast, either fixed or in a swinging centreboard or dagger board to make them easier to launch and retrieve. This makes these boats more stable than a dinghy, as well as less prone to capsize and more capable of self-righting. Sails on trailer sailers can also be lowered easily on water unlike dinghies which are often rigged fully on the shore.

Trailer sailers offer a number of advantages over larger boats that are impractical to tow on a trailer. Because they can be towed and stored at home, owners can avoid the mooring fees and maintenance costs of boats that remain in the water. Towing is also a relatively fast and efficient way of reaching new destinations from which to sail. However, they generally have less living space. All but the biggest do not have standing room in their cabins. Moreover, trailer sailers are generally more lightly-built and ballasted, making them incapable of tackling open oceans, confining them to coastal and protected waters.

History

The first trailer sailers were built in the 1950s. They were light, marine plywood boats designed for home builders. Robert Tucker in the UK designed the Silhouette, in the early 1950s. His concept was to build a small boat suitable for overnight camping, which could be trailed to different locations behind a small car. It is thought that over 3000 of this type have been built. The TS16 was built in large numbers in New Zealand and Australia, spurring the popularity of trailer sailers in these countries. Over 12,000 boats of this type have been built.

The advent of mass production fibreglass boats in the mid 1960s saw an expansion of trailer sailer designs, such as the Aquarius 21 Boomerang 20, Cal 21, Careel 18, Neptune 16, and Pearson 22. The Catalina 22,launched in 1969, is particularly notable as it continues in production, with over 15,000 built.

Trailer cabin sailboats appeared on the US market in 1970 and were sailed on small lakes and rivers. A large number were initially sold in North America in areas such as Arizona, New Mexico and the Great Lakes region.

In the late 1980s and early 1990s trailer sailers evolved into sportsboats, of a similar size but more optimised for racing speed with reduced accommodation and lightweight hulls.  There is an absence of an accepted definition of the term.

Accommodation

Cabins in trailer sailers are usually arranged with dual purpose settee-berths running along the side of the boat from a V-berth at the bow, to quarter berths underneath the cockpit. Usually, the centreboard or daggerboard trunk encroaches into the cabin in the middle of the boat, but can form the base for a folding table. Some types have a small four person table with club seating. Boats may or may not have a small galley with a stove, a food preparation area and a sink. In terms of headroom, the smallest types do not have sitting head room for taller sailors, while only the largest have standing headroom. Some boats address this problem using cabin pop-tops that can be raised when not underway to provide additional head room.

The smallest trailer sailers in the  range generally have two berths. As boats become larger four berths are commonly fitted, with a V-berth at the bow and quarter berths at the rear. Larger boats might have up to six berths. Many trailer sailers have a small galley with a stove, built in, although on smaller trailer sailers, this may be omitted. Usually, trailer sailers have a head, which is most commonly a portable toilet, mounted in the bow V-berth area of the cabin. Some larger boats however have an enclosed toilet.

Towing

Trailer sailers, by necessity, must be transported by trailer, which places a number of restrictions on their design. To make them easy to launch, retrieve and transport by trailer, boats cannot have long fixed keels. Therefore, most trailer sailers have swing keel centreboards or daggerboards. 
Generally a trailer sailer should be towable behind a vehicle without special licences for oversized loads. This means that the beam is usually limited to approximately  depending on jurisdiction. Weight limitations are determined by the towing vehicle. Smaller trailer sailers can weigh  or less and can easily be towed behind average cars, while larger, heavily ballasted trailer sailers can weigh over  require heavy vehicles with specialised towing equipment. Larger trailer sailers over 26 ft are difficult to tow and are sometimes kept in the water and only placed on their trailers for occasional towing or storage.

Trailer sailer masts must be lowered for towing. This becomes difficult on larger boats with heavier, longer masts. Such boats require complex mast raising systems.

Some sailboat designs for trailering incorporate special features. The MacGregor 26S, for example is a boat  in length, but that weighs  empty and dry and carries  of flooding water ballast in tanks which are filled when the boat is launched and drained when the boat is removed from the water, thus making the boat lighter to transport than if it used more traditional iron or lead ballast. The design also has a pivoting centreboard, plus a pivoting rudder and easily rigged mast to make getting the boat from the trailer to the water easy to accomplish.

On the design limitations of trailerable boats with flooding water ballast, Cruising World writer Bill Lee said in 1996:

Rigging

Most trailer sailers use a Bermuda rig with one stayed mast, a mainsail and a single foresail.

Mast raising
Masts can be raised by attaching them to the deck and walking them up. This is practical on smaller boats with lightweight masts, but as larger boats have longer and heavier masts. On such boats, raising the mast by brute force requires significant strength and is beyond the abilities of smaller, frail and short-handed crews. Therefore, many designs employ mast raising systems to make the task easier. Methods vary but can be classed into three groups.

One method is to use the boom as a gin pole, laying the mast on deck, with the boom at right angles. Hauling on the boom then raises the mast. This method has the advantage of using equipment that is already on the boat. A second method is to attach two poles called shear legs in an A-frame configuration with poles running from the sheer to meet above the boat. The mast can then be hauled upward using the forestay. This method requires additional equipment. A third method is to attach a pole to the winch post on the trailer and haul the mast upwards once again with the forestay, which also requires additional equipment.

As the mast is being raised, it must be tensioned laterally. In many boats, the sidestays are not attached to the deck close to the axis of rotation of the mast and therefore tighten or loosen as the mast raises. The mast can be either held straight by a second person, or with temporary babystays mounted close to the masts axis of rotation.

Engines

Trailer sailers usually have a motor for docking and maneuvering. Most trailer sailers use outboard motors, which are best suited to sailboats 28 ft in length and under. Outboards offer the advantage of being light, easy to use and maintain and are also inexpensive, as they are commercially produced on a large scale and sold off-the-shelf. They can also be raised out of the water, to eliminate drag when sailing. This contrasts with inboard diesel engines which are heavy and occupy significant internal space and are best suited to larger vessels.

Outboard motors used for trailer sailers need to be geared down as trailer sailers sail at slow displacement speeds compared to the higher planing speeds of powerboats, which are the most common application for outboard motors. Outboards are often mounted on the transom, with some boats mounting them in a well, also at the stern. Outboards may be mounted on a lifting mount, to allow them to be raised up out of the water. Long shaft outboard motors are advantageous, as they prevent the propeller from exiting the water and over-speeding when the boat rides over waves.

Anchoring
Trailer sailers usually carry anchoring equipment. Due to their small size, the tackle is also light and can be lowered and raised by hand. Therefore power winches are unnecessary.

See also
Day sailer
Pocket cruiser

References

Notes

Citations

Bibliography

 
Trailers